The 17th Grand National Assembly of Turkey existed from 6 November 1983 to 29 November 1987. Actually there is one other parliament between the 16th parliament of Turkey and the 17th parliament of Turkey. But the members of the chamber of deputies in 1981-83 term were appointed members rather than elected members and usually chamber of deputies is not included in the list of the parliaments in Turkey. There were 399 MPs in the parliament . Motherland Party (ANAP) held the majority. Populist Party (HP) and Nationalist Democracy Party (MDP) were the other parties. The parties of pre 1980 era were closed by the military rule of Coup d'état . (Some later on were refounded.)

Main parliamentary milestones 
Some of the important events in the history of the parliament are the following:
4 December 1983- Necmettin Karaduman was elected as the speaker of the Turkish parliament
13 December 1984 – Turgut Özal formed the 45th government of Turkey
2 November 1985 – SODEP and HP two parties sharing the same background were merged. The new party was named Social Democratic Peoples Party (SHP)
4 May 1986 – MDP dissolved itself
9 May 1965 - Free Democratic Party was founded by Mehmet Yazar
28 November 1986 – Free Democratic Party merged to ANAP
6 September 1987 - Referendum on the political rights of the pre-1980 politicians (ANAP campaigned for the rejection) It was accepted by a very narrow margin
29 November 1987 – General election

References

1983 establishments in Turkey
1977 disestablishments in Turkey
Terms of the Grand National Assembly of Turkey
17th parliament of Turkey
Social Democratic Populist Party (Turkey)
Motherland Party (Turkey)
Populist Party (Turkey)
Nationalist Democracy Party
Social Democracy Party (Turkey)
Free Democratic Party (Turkey)
Political history of Turkey